Lycée Marie-Curie may refer to the following schools named after Marie Curie:

In France:
  - In Sceaux
 lycée Marie-Curie d'Échirolles - In Échirolles
  - In Marseille
 lycée Marie-Curie de Nogent-sur-Oise - in Nogent-sur-Oise
 lycée Marie-Curie de Strasbourg - in Strasbourg
 lycée Marie-Curie de Tarbes - in Tarbes
 lycée Marie-Curie de Versailles - in Versailles

Outside France:
 Lycée Français Marie Curie de Zurich
 Lycée Marie-Curie d'Hanoï
 Lycée Marie-Curie d'Hô-Chi-Minh-Ville